Sports Radio Detroit (SRD) was a Detroit-based internet sports broadcasting and news network covering Detroit's professional sports teams Detroit Lions, Detroit Tigers, Detroit Pistons and Detroit Red Wings as well as college and high school sports across the region.

History

Early history
SportsRadioDetroit originally began as an independent, experimental podcast series entitled, The Red Line in collaboration with the unofficial Detroit Red Wings site, LetsGoWings.com, founded by Mike Morland. The show debuted on the independent website, LetsGoWingsMedia.com on October 31, 2011. The podcast shifted to a permanent home at LetsGoWingsRadio.com in September 2012. It was here that the site continued to flourish during the summer of 2012 and into the NHL lockout in the fall of 2012.

SportsRadioDetroit.com
With the potential of a long-term NHL lockout looming for the 2012-2013 season, production of The Red Line podcast series and Letsgowingsradio.com were also anticipating a decrease in content production. As a result of a strong Detroit sports market and few sports radio options, both LetsGoWingsRadio.com and The Red Line were dissolved in favor of a new venture, sportsradiodetroit.com, founded by "The Red Line" and letsgowingsradio.com host and creator, Mike Morland.

The new website, which official launched in the Fall of 2012, featured four independent online sports talk shows featuring the Detroit Lions, Tigers, Pistons and Red Wings. In addition to covering the four major professional sports teams in Detroit, Sports Radio Detroit (SRD) added coverage for soccer in the summer of 2013. With the expanded coverage, additional media personalities and NHL lockout of 2012, SportsRadioDetroit.com was born.

SportsRadioDetroit.com aired its first original broadcast on January 18, 2013 with the first episode of Red Wings SRD. The first live show on occurred on April 25, 2013.

On November 17, 2013, Sports Radio Detroit launched an updated website and introduced its new logo and brand, "SRD" - an update from the previous "Sports Radio Detroit" logo.

In an effort to better connect Detroit sports fans with their favorite athletes and columnists, SRD launched with a variety of interviews, including then Detroit City FC star and former MLS player, Knox Cameron, NFL Linebacker Chris Wilson, Detroit Lions Ndamukong Suh, Windsor Star sports columnist Bob Duff, Hockey Hall of Famer Larry Murphy, Detroit Red Wings center Riley Sheahan and Red Wings prospect Anthony Mantha.

Induction to Detroit Sports Broadcasters Association
Sports Radio Detroit became a member of Detroit Sports Media (formerly the Detroit Sports Broadcasters Association) in 2017. On December 7, 2019, Roger Castillo of SRD was announced as a board member of the organization.

Website ceases operation and current use of SRD branding
On December 26, 2021, after nearly a decade of operation, it was announced on Twitter that the Sports Radio Detroit website would cease operation and that some of the shows would continue on in various formats. Beginning in 2022, SRD's social media accounts began operating in affiliation with the Detroit Sports Podcast. The Detroit Sports Podcast is affiliated with Fan Nation of Sports Illustrated.

Contests

Detroit March Madness
Beginning March 16, 2014, Sports Radio Detroit launched the first annual "Favorite Detroit Female Media Personality" contest. The public bracket-style contest highlighted 32 of Detroit's best based on media presence, quality of work and likability. After five rounds of voting, including 13,236 votes in 22 days, Amy Andrews of Fox 2 Detroit was named the 2014 Favorite Detroit Female Media Personality Award recipient. Fox 2 Detroit announced Amy Andrews win during live broadcasts on Friday, April 18 and Monday, April 21, 2014.

On March 16, 2015, the SRD Favorite Detroit Female Media Personality contest returned for its second year. After 22 days and over 350,000 votes, Lauren Podell of WDIV Local 4 was named the winner.

Operation format
SportsRadioDetroit.com was founded as an independent, non-profit media organization providing an AM/FM sports talk alternative in the Detroit market.

In comparison to traditional AM/FM sports talk stations in Detroit that host several shows a day and encompass all of its professional teams, sportsradiodetroit.com operates under the "one-to-one" sports talk model. Each of Detroit's four professional sports teams (in addition to soccer) have their own independent online podcast/radio broadcast. Although the topics generally revolve around each specific team, the shows also includes topics from the national level within each sport (example: Red Wings coverage also includes NHL-wide topics).

In addition to online radio and podcasts, Sports Radio Detroit delivers traditional digital print content. With an emphasis on alternative perspectives driven by fact-based opinions, SRD's staff is composed of experienced broadcasters and writers (from major/minor media companies and organizations) who provide a fresh voice in Detroit media.

Media affiliations
Sports Radio Detroit is a member of Detroit Sports Media (formerly the Detroit Sports Broadcasters Association). On December 7, 2019, Roger Castillo of SRD was announced as a board member of the organization.

External links

Podcasts and online radio
Lions SRD (Detroit Lions talk show)
Pistons SRD (Detroit Pistons talk show)
Tigers SRD (Detroit Tigers talk show)
Spinning the Wheels SRD (Detroit Red Wings talk show)
Soccer Report on SRD (Soccer talk show)
The Laugh Track Podcast (Pop Culture & Film talk show)
Out of Bounds Detroit (Sports and Pop Culture talk show)
Parsons and Slow (Politics, Topical, humor talk show)
Grave Discussions (Horror genre talk show)
Over Under Fair (Rating Pop Culture Topics Talk Show)
On The Button (MMA Podcast)
SRD Roadshow (Topics include National sports, Detroit sports and news of the week talk show)
Fanarchy (An uncensored hip-hop, pop culture, and sports talk show)
The Whip and Neigh Neigh Podcast (Horse Racing talk show)
Mitten Sports Talk (Michigan sports talk show)
Pucking Around (NHL talk show)

Columns
NFL/Lions Report
NBA/Pistons Report
MLB/Tigers Report
NHL/Red Wings Report
Soccer Report on SRD

References

Radio stations in Detroit